The Australian Film Institute Award for Best Light Entertainment Television Series is awarded annually by the Australian Film Institute as part of the awards in television for excellence in light entertainment. The award commenced in 2003.

Best Light Entertainment Television Series

See also
 Australian Film Institute
 AFI Awards
 Australian Film Institute Television Awards

References

L
Awards established in 2003